The Fovant Badges are a set of regimental badges cut into a chalk hill, Fovant Down, near Fovant, in southwest Wiltshire, England. They were created by soldiers garrisoned nearby, and waiting to go to France, during the First World War; the first in 1916. They are clearly visible from the A30 road which runs through the village. Nine of the original twenty remain, and are scheduled ancient monuments and recognised by the Imperial War Museum as war memorials. Further badges have been added more recently.

The Fovant Badge Society holds an annual Drumhead Service which is attended by the Australian High Commissioner, local mayors and members of parliament. These services fund the upkeep of the badges.

Construction 

After the outlines were cut into the grass-covered hillsides, they were refilled with chalk brought from a nearby slope, up to 50 tons per badge. The badges took an average fifty men six months to complete.

The badges

Current badges
Reading left to right (north-east to south-west), the badges at Fovant are:

 Royal Wiltshire Yeomanry (only central part remaining)
 YMCA, restored in 2018.
 6th (City of London) Battalion, London Regiment (City of London Rifles) (claimed to be the first of the badges cut here)
 Australian Commonwealth Military Forces (the largest, 51m×32m)
 Royal Corps of Signals (cut in 1970 to commemorate the Corps' 50th anniversary)
 Wiltshire Regiment (added in 1950)
 5th (City of London) Battalion, London Regiment (London Rifle Brigade)
 8th (City of London) Battalion, London Regiment (Post Office Rifles)
 Devonshire Regiment

Centenary badge
To commemorate the centenary of the first badge, created in 1916, a badge in the shape of a poppy, to represent the poppies that grew in "Flanders Fields", was created in 2016.

Lost badges
Several of the lost badges were short lived, small and crudely constructed.

 Royal Army Service Corps
 Royal Army Medical Corps, possibly on the site of where Royal Wiltshire Yeomanry is now.
 Machine Gun Corps
 Queen Victoria's Rifles
 35th Training Battalion
 'Dingo'
 Post Office Rifles 'POR' letters, possibly there prior to the current Post Office Rifles figure.
 7th Battalion of the City of London Regiment (there is also a figure for this Regiment in Sutton Mandeville)
 9th Royal Berkshire Regiment
 37th Training Battalion
 Voluntary Aid Detachment

Nearby badges

 The previously unrestored military badge at Sutton Down of the Royal Warwickshire Regiment was restored during 2017 and spring 2018 by volunteers of the Sutton Mandeville Heritage Trust. It was supported by a grant from the National Lottery and the restored badge was inaugurated on 3 May 2018 by Prince Edward, Duke of Kent, Colonel-in-Chief of the Royal Regiment of Fusiliers, the successor to the Royal Warwickshire Regiment.
 The nearby badge of 7th Battalion, The London Regiment remains unrestored.
 An outline map of Australia on Compton Down was created by Australian troops garrisoned in Hurdcott Camp in the fields below, while training and awaiting transport to the battlefields. It is a scheduled monument. After more than 20 years of neglect it was restored during 2018/19 by a local voluntary group called the Map of Australia Trust (MOAT). A remembrance service was held on the map on 25 April 2019, Anzac Day, to mark the restoration and to honour the Australian troops who had been accommodated locally. The service was attended by over 100 people including the Lord Lieutenant of Wiltshire, Sarah Troughton, the deputy Australian High Commissioner, Matt Anderson, and travelling from Australia, the daughter of a soldier who had been at Hurdcott Camp recovering from war wounds.
 On Lamb Down, on the north side of the A36 between Codford and the Deptford interchange and about 9 miles north by west of Fovant, is a cutting of the Australian Commonwealth Military Force badge. It is less detailed than the one at Fovant. It was cut in 1916–1917.
 Near Barford St Martin, at the eastern end of the Fovant Encampment, was formerly the Finsbury Rifles badge. Little is known of this figure.
 About 20 miles from the Fovant Badges, at Bulford Camp, is the Bulford Kiwi, another military hill figure (though not a badge).

References

External links

Fovant Badge Society

Hill figures in England
Military history of Wiltshire
World War I memorials in England
Chalk
Scheduled monuments in Wiltshire
Tourist attractions in Wiltshire
Monuments and memorials in Wiltshire